Forskalia is a genus of siphonophores. It is the only genus in the monotypic family Forskaliidae.

Species
The following species are classified within the genus Forskalia:
 Forskalia asymmetrica Pugh, 2003
 Forskalia contorta (Milne-Edwards, 1841)
 Forskalia edwardsi Kölliker, 1853
 Forskalia formosa Keferstein & Ehlers, 1860
 Forskalia saccula Pugh, 2003
 Forskalia tholoides Haeckel, 1888

References

Bioluminescent cnidarians
Physonectae
Cnidarian families